Godda is a town n.

References

Union councils of Lasbela District
Populated places in Lasbela District